Zelyony Gay is a rural locality (a settlement) in Beryozovskoye Rural Settlement, Buturlinovsky District, Voronezh Oblast, Russia. The population was 240 as of 2010. There are 3 streets.

Geography 
Zelyony Gay is located 7 km southwest of Buturlinovka (the district's administrative centre) by road. Maryevka is the nearest rural locality.

References 

Rural localities in Buturlinovsky District